Recorded on March 19, 2003, in Stockholm, Sweden, Live. 02 is Isis's second live release. It is sourced from a Swedish radio recording, and, as such, is the best-sounding of Isis' live releases thus far. The original radio broadcast on P3 Live did not feature the song "Carry."

As with the rest of the live series, the CD version was self-released. A vinyl LP limited to 1000 copies was released on December 6, 2005 through Troubleman Unlimited.  Of the vinyl, 100 were on white with a poster available through mailorder only, the remaining 900 were on black. Along with all Isis' other live albums, it is set to be re-released on June 14, 2011 in digital format almost a full year after Isis' dissolution.

Track listing
All songs written by Isis.

 "From Sinking" – 10:56
 "Glisten" – 7:11
 "Carry" – 7:30
 "Weight" – 13:09
 "The Beginning and the End" – 9:48
 "Celestial (Ext./Alt. Version)" – 17:25

Personnel
 Helena "Nenne" Zetterberg - Radio producing
 Nick Zampiello - Mastering
 Jeff Caxide - Bass guitar
 Aaron Harris - drums
 Michael Gallagher - Guitar
 Bryant Clifford Meyer - Electronics, guitar
 Aaron Turner - vocals, guitar, design
 Ayal Naor - Guitar on "Weight"
 Maria Christopher - Guitar, vocals on "Weight"
 Greg Moss - Live sound

References

External links 
 Live II at Bandcamp (streamed copy where licensed)

Isis (band) live albums
Albums with cover art by Aaron Turner
2004 live albums